The South Boise Fire Station, at 1011 Williams St. in Boise, Idaho, was built in 1914.  It was designed by architects Tourtellotte & Hummel.  It was listed on the National Register of Historic Places in 1982.

It is a one-and-a-half-story brick bungalow style building,  in plan.

It was designed in 1913 and was completed in 1914.

References

Fire stations in Idaho
National Register of Historic Places in Ada County, Idaho
Buildings and structures completed in 1914
Tourtellotte & Hummel buildings